is a Japanese hip hop recording artist better known by his stage name Seamo (シーモ Shīmo). He made his debut in 2004 using the alias , but later changed his name to Seamo. He made his solo debut in 2005 with the Japanese record label BMG Japan with the single . Seamo became famous when he appeared along with the duo Bennie K on the song "A Love Story." His debut album is Get Back On Stage, released on October 31, 2005. His second album, Live Goes On, made its debut on the Japanese chart at number one. As his favorite artists and influences, Seamo lists Kool Keith, MC Hammer, and Japanese acts Unicorn, Sing Like Talking, and Original Love. In 2008, he released "Honey Honey Feat. Ayuse Kozue", this song was used as the ending theme song of the second season of the anime xxxHolic, xxxHolic: Kei. His song "My Answer" was used as the tenth ending of the popular anime Naruto Shippuden. His song "Umi e Ikou" was featured as the ending theme for the 2010 live-action drama Moyashimon.

Discography

Compilations
 "Stock Delivery" (2008)
 "Best Of Seamo" (2009)
 "Collabo Densetsu" (2011)
 "Love Song Collection" (2014)

Albums
 Get Back On Stage (2005)
 Live Goes On (2006)
 Round About (2007)
 Stock Delivery (2008)
 Scrap & Build (2008)
 "messenger" (2011)
 "REVOLUTION" (2012)
 "To The Future" (2013)
 “Moshi Moseamo?” (2018)
 “Glory” (2019)
”Wave My Flag” (2019)

Singles
 
 "Drive"
 "Kanpaku"
 "A Love Story"
 "Mata Aimashou"
 
 
 "Cry Baby"
 "Fly Away"
 "Kiseki"
 
 "Mother"
 "Honey Honey (feat. Ayuse Kozue)"
 "Yasashii Kaze"
 "My Answer"
 "Continue"
 "ONE LIFE"
 "Owari to Hajimari\Lost Boy
 "HOLD MY HAND (feat. HOME MADE Kazoku)"
 Yakusoku (Promise)
 "Umi e Ikou"
 "Kimi ni 1-nichi 1-kai "Suki" to Iu"
 "Yogoreta Tsubasa De"

EP
 "5 WOMEN" (2010)
 "ONE LIFE" (2011)

Collaborations
 Small World
 September 19, 2002
 1,890 Copies
 
 May 9, 2002
 Koino abc Iede 
 September 10, 2003
 Onani-Machine＆Seamonator
 The Club
 March 8, 2006
 Tenjou Chiki feat. Seamo
 Win and Shine
 May 24, 2006
 From the collaborations of the Ukatrats FC, produced by m-flo's Taku Takahashi
 5,692 Copies
 swing presents...Peace from Central Japan
 June 28, 2006
 Hey Boy! Hey Girl!
 Seamo feat. BoA
 SEAMO X SPYAIR – Rock This Way
 October 17, 2012
 SEAMO feat. SPYAIR

References

External links
 Seamo official site 
 Seamo (Universal J)
 Seamo (Sony Music Japan)
 

Living people
1975 births
Japanese musicians
Universal Music Japan artists
Sony Music Entertainment Japan artists
Japanese racehorse owners and breeders
Musicians from Aichi Prefecture